Kevin Cassese (born April 5, 1981) is a professional lacrosse player with the Philadelphia Barrage, and head coach of the Lehigh University men's lacrosse team.

Cassese played collegiate lacrosse at Duke University, where he helped lead the Blue Devils to three NCAA Tournament appearances.  In 2002, he won the McLaughlin Award as the nation's top midfielder.  In 2002, Cassese played with Team USA that won the World Lacrosse Championship.  In 2006, he was also a member of the Team USA, who finished in second place.

Cassese played professionally with Major League Lacrosse's Rochester Rattlers from 2003 until June 29, 2007, when he was traded to the Philadelphia Barrage. He was named the MVP of the 2006 Major League Lacrosse All-Star Game as a member of Team USA. He was also a standout for the MLL's Boston Cannons.

On July 5, 2007, Cassese was named head coach of the Lehigh University lacrosse team.  Prior to this, he served as assistant coach for the Duke Blue Devils and for the Stony Brook Seawolves.

Awards
2001 ACC Player of the Year
Three time All-American
Inducted into the Suffolk Sports Hall of Fame on Long Island, New York, in the Lacrosse Category with the Class of 2009.

References

1981 births
Living people
American lacrosse players
Duke Blue Devils men's lacrosse players
Duke Blue Devils men's lacrosse coaches
Lehigh Mountain Hawks men's lacrosse coaches
Major League Lacrosse players
Stony Brook Seawolves men's lacrosse coaches